Insomnio is the fourth album of the Puerto Rican rock band Sol D'Menta and their third studio album. It is also the first album to feature new singer Omar Hernández. The album was released on July 13, 2001.

The album includes a cover of the popular salsa song "Calle Luna, Calle Sol" originally sung by Héctor Lavoe and Willie Colón.

Track listing 
 "Canción de una canción"
 "Insomnio"
 "Lánzate"
 "Locomotora"
 "Sentido Contrario"
 "El Principio"
 "Un Par de Latidos"
 "Voices in My Head"
 "Calle Luna, Calle Sol"
 "El Velo de La Verdad"
 "Rebeldia"
 "Funkadelicpsycomenta"

Musicians

Band members
 Omar Hernández - vocals
 Erick "Jey" Seda - bass
 Miguel "Tito" Rodríguez - guitar
 Ernesto "Che" Rodríguez - drums

Guest musicians
 John Avila - bass solo on "Canción de una Canción", keyboards, vocals
 John Ewing Jr. - loops and samples
 Sam "Hammond" Avila - hammond organ
 Daniel Hall - DJ effects
 Draco rosa- calle luna calle sol

Personnel
 Produced by John Avila
 Co-produced by John Ewing Jr.
 Recorded and mixed at Brando's Paradise Studios, San Gabriel, California
 Recording Engineer - John Ewing Jr.
 Additional Recording - John Avila
 Digital Engineering - John Ewing Jr. and John Avila
 Mixed by John Ewing Jr. except "Canción de una canción", "El velo de la Verdad" and "Lánzate" mixed by John Avila
 Mastered at Precision Mastering, Los Angeles, California
 Mastering Engineer - Tom Baker

2001 albums
Albums produced by John Avila
Sol D'Menta albums